You Were Here is an album by Canadian singer-songwriter Sarah Harmer, released in 2000.

Background
You Were Here was Harmer's commercial breakthrough in Canada after years of almost reaching the pop charts with Weeping Tile. The album's lead single, "Basement Apt.", had previously been a Weeping Tile song, appearing on that band's 1995 release eepee. The album's second single, "Don't Get Your Back Up", had previously been recorded by Harmer with The Saddletramps. Three other songs, "Weakened State", "Lodestar" and "Coffee Stain", had also been previously recorded by Weeping Tile, on 1998's This Great Black Night.

Harmer stated "I always had kind of high expectations for You Were Here, but I was holding onto it for as long as I could, to find a proper, appropriate home." She self-financed and self-released the album on her own Cold Snap Records label before it was licensed by Zoë Records and Universal Music Canada.

Harmer appeared in support of the album on the Late Show with David Letterman on October 2, 2001, in an appearance in which stage manager Biff Henderson jumped in to sing impromptu backing vocals. She had originally been scheduled to appear the previous week, but was bumped when Rudy Giuliani's first post-9/11 appearance ran overtime.

The album's title track is a tribute to her former Weeping Tile bandmate Joe Chithalen, who died in 1999.

The Art Of Time Ensemble featuring Sarah Slean recorded a Roberto Occhipinti arrangement of "Lodestar" on their 2009 album Black Flowers.

Reception

The album was warmly received. TIME ranked You Were Here in its year-end Top Ten list, calling it the year's best debut album.

You Were Here was named the 24th greatest Canadian album of all time in Bob Mersereau's 2007 book The Top 100 Canadian Albums.

Music critic Lisa M. Smith, writing for Allmusic, praised the album, and wrote of Harmer that "it is certain that she is an artist choosing wisely from a great scope of colors. With a pleasing and misleading start, the rollicking opening track asserts its individuality with a Vaudevillian clarinet, keeping one foot in Kinks pop and one in some elusive species of country rock." She describes the album as one of a pleasing ebb and flow. "Songs may begin with a soft acoustic, then unfold assuredly toward their climax. Various instruments add character now and then, such as a muted trumpet or a harmonica, and the energy level can sway between a lullaby and full pop treatment with a definite destination… the album as a whole feels sincere, answering to a variety of moods and whims. It is a work of quality, from the songwriting clear to the production." Rolling Stone gave the album 3.5 of 5 stars, stating it contained "Plainly hooky, tender-but-tough songs...Harmer lovingly chronicles the rough-and-tumble of real-life romance....a marvelously compelling meditation"

Q gave You Were Here 3 of 5 stars and called it "Lounge jazz, drum loops and lead guitar chops support a vocalist whose lyrical panache...marks her out from the crowd."

In an interview with No Depression, Paul Cantin called it "a welcome break from the Lilith school of flinchy girl singers. Her music is at once heartfelt and hardy, sensitive and sanguine."

Track listing
All songs written by Sarah Harmer, except where noted.
"Around This Corner" – 3:15
"Basement Apt." – 4:08
"The Hideout" – 4:01
"Capsized" – 3:57
"Lodestar" – 5:28
"Weakened State" – 2:53
"Don't Get Your Back Up" – 3:54
"Open Window (The Wedding Song)" – 4:09
"Uniform Grey" – 3:43
"Coffee Stain" – 2:56
"You Were Here" – 4:53
"Everytime" (Dave Hodge) – 3:12

Personnel
Sarah Harmer – vocals, guitar, organ, harmonica, tambourine, Wurlitzer
Gord Tough – guitar
Benji Perosin – trumpet
Gavin Brown – drums
Peter Prilesnik – bass, beats, electric guitar, dobro, guitar
Cam Giruoux – drums
Al Cross – drums
Jason Euringer – background vocals
Spencer Evans – clarinet
Maury LaFoy – bass, upright bass
Kevin Fox – cello
Damon Richardson – drums
Jenny Whiteley – background vocals
Luther Wright – guitar

Production
Produced by Peter Prilesnik and Sarah Harmer
Mixed by Eric Ratz
Engineered by Pete Prilesnik
Mastered by Brett Zilahi
Editing by Blair Robb, Steve Webster and Brett Zilahi
Cover photo by Yael Staav
Photography by Luther Wright
Design by Greg Hall

Year-end charts

References

2000 albums
Sarah Harmer albums
Zoë Records albums